John Minogue (born 21 December 1959 in Scariff, County Clare, Ireland) is an Irish hurling manager and former player.  He is the current manager of the Clare under-21 hurling team.

Minogue  captained UCC to 1 Fitzgibbon Cup  in 1981 and also won a medal the next year 1982. He captained the combined universities team in 1981. He played his club hurling with Scariff and at inter-county level with Clare, playing in two County Finals and winning one Clare Cup. He was a corner-back on the latter team at various intervals throughout the 1980s, as well as serving as team captain for a season. He captained Clare to win the Oireachtas Cup in 1983.

In retirement from playing Minogue has become involved in team management at various levels.  In his role as a teacher he has guided St. Flannan's College to 6 of Dr. Harty Cup titles and 3 All Ireland Colleges titles.  Between 2000 and 2002 Minogue was a selector under Cyril Lyons on the Clare senior hurling team reaching an All Ireland Final.  He managed  the Clare under-21 hurling team, a team that captured the Munster and All-Ireland titles in 2009.

References

Teams

1959 births
Living people
Scariff hurlers
Clare inter-county hurlers
Hurling managers